= Kewtali =

Kewtali is a village in Garwara, Uttar Pradesh, India.
